La Jacques-Cartier is a regional county municipality in the Capitale-Nationale region of Quebec, Canada. The seat is in Shannon.  It is named after the Jacques-Cartier River which runs through it and takes its source in its upper country.

Subdivisions
There are 10 subdivisions within the RCM:

Cities & Towns (6)
 Fossambault-sur-le-Lac
 Lac-Delage
 Lac-Saint-Joseph
 Sainte-Brigitte-de-Laval
 Sainte-Catherine-de-la-Jacques-Cartier
 Shannon

Municipalities (2)
 Lac-Beauport
 Saint-Gabriel-de-Valcartier

United Townships (1)
 Stoneham-et-Tewkesbury

Unorganized Territory (1)
 Lac-Croche

Demographics

Population

Language

Transportation

Access Routes
Highways and numbered routes that run through the municipality, including external routes that start or finish at the county border:

 Autoroutes
 
 

 Principal Highways
 

 Secondary Highways
 
 
 
 

 External Routes
 None

See also
 List of regional county municipalities and equivalent territories in Quebec

References 

 
Census divisions of Quebec